The 1971–72 BBC2 Floodlit Trophy was the seventh occasion on which the BBC2 Floodlit Trophy competition had been held.
This year was another new name on the  trophy
St. Helens won the trophy by beating Rochdale Hornets by the score of 8-2
The match was played at Knowsley Road, Eccleston, St Helens, Merseyside. The attendance was 9,255 and receipts were £2,493
This was St. Helens first victory after being runner-up in three of the  previous six finals

Background 
This season saw no changes in the  entrants, no new members and no withdrawals, the number remaining at eighteen.
The format was changed back to that favoured in previous seasons when the  preliminary round was played on a two-legged home and away basis with the  rest of the tournament being played on a knock-out basis.
The preliminary round involved four clubs, to reduce the  numbers to sixteen.

Competition and results

Preliminary round – first leg 
Involved  2 matches and 4 clubs

Preliminary round – second leg 
Involved  2 matches and the same 4 Clubs in reverse fixtures

Round 1 – first round 
Involved  8 matches and 16 clubs

Round 2 – quarter finals 
Involved 4 matches with 8 clubs

Round 3 – semi-finals  
Involved 2 matches and 4 clubs

Final

Teams and scorers 

Scoring - Try = three (3) points - Goal = two (2) points - Drop goal = two (2) points

The road to success 
This tree excludes any preliminary round fixtures

Notes and comments 
1 * This match was televised
2 * Rothmans Rugby League Yearbook 1990-1991 and 1991-92 and the  St. Helens official archives give the  attendance as 9,300, but RUGBYLEAGUEprojects gives it as 9,255
3  * Knowsley Road was the home of St Helens R.F.C. from 1890 until its closure in 2010. The final capacity was 17,500 although the record attendance was 35,695 set on 26 December 1949 for a league game between St Helens and Wigan.

General information for those unfamiliar 
The Rugby League BBC2 Floodlit Trophy was a knock-out competition sponsored by the BBC and between rugby league clubs, entrance to which was conditional upon the club having floodlights. Most matches were played on an evening, and those of which the second half was televised, were played on a Tuesday evening.
Despite the competition being named as 'Floodlit', many matches took place during the afternoons and not under floodlights, and several of the entrants, including  Barrow and Bramley did not have adequate lighting. And, when in 1973, due to the world oil crisis, the government restricted the use of floodlights in sport, all the matches, including the Trophy final, had to be played in the afternoon rather than at night.
The Rugby League season always (until the onset of "Summer Rugby" in 1996) ran from around August-time through to around May-time and this competition always took place early in the season, in the Autumn, with the final taking place in December (The only exception to this was when disruption of the fixture list was caused by inclement weather)

See also 
1971–72 Northern Rugby Football League season
1971 Lancashire Cup
1971 Yorkshire Cup
BBC2 Floodlit Trophy
Rugby league county cups

References

External links
Saints Heritage Society
1896–97 Northern Rugby Football Union season at wigan.rlfans.com
Hull&Proud Fixtures & Results 1896/1897
Widnes Vikings - One team, one passion Season In Review - 1896-97
The Northern Union at warringtonwolves.org
Huddersfield R L Heritage

BBC2 Floodlit Trophy
BBC2 Floodlit Trophy